Waukauyengtipu (or Waukauyeng-tipu, meaning "the mountain of the place of the butterfly" in the local Indigenous Arekuna language) is a mountain in South America situated in most part within the boundaries of the Paruima territory in the Cuyuni-Mazaruni Region of Guyana. The major part of its area is approx.  with some areas elevated up to approx. 1800m a.s.l., although its actual elevation has never been accurately measured and as for now can only be estimated from satellite imagery. The plateau belongs to the westernmost area in Guyana and is also one of the highest mountains in the country.

Biology 
Cloud forest vegetation is present on Waukauyengtipu on its upper slopes and summit plateau. The plateau hosts typical Pantepui vegetation including large amounts of plants such as Brocchinia tatei, Brocchinia acuminata, Clusia sp., Didymiandrum stellatum or Philodendron insigne. 

In the central part of the mesa there are scattered occurrences of tepui scrub forests with Bonnetia sessilis and occasional transitions into peat wetlands dominated by Stegolepis ptaritepuiensis. The peat wetlands host other species like Orectanthe sceptrum or Drosera roraimae, making Waukauyengtipu one of just few locations in Guyana where such plants can be observed.

History of exploration 
The first recorded ascent of the mountain was completed during a Smithsonian botanical expedition led by H. David Clarke between in July 1997, during which extensive herbarium material was collected.

The second successful ascent and short botanical exploration of the summit plateau took place in January 2019.

Nomenclatural inaccuracies 
Waukauyengtipu is often mistakenly synonymized with Mount Venamo, yet they are separate plateaus and each should be recognized by their respective, separate names. Most of the information about the true location and elevation of Cerro Venamo are taken from the results of Julian A. Steyermark's and Galfrid Dunsterville's botanical exploration of the mountain in Venezuela in 1963 and 1964. Due to the assumptions regarding the true elevation and area of the massif having been made with only the instrumentation available at that time, some information proves to be inaccurate when compared to modern satellite data. Moreover, the exploration history of both Mount Venamo and Waukauyengtipu is limited to a few overland expeditions and short helicopter landings, all of which had succeeded in studying only isolated, scattered areas of the plateaus. Waukauyengtipu is situated approximately 27 km southeast of Cerro Venamo.

References

Further reading 

 Website of Darrell Carpenay (co-organizer and member of the 2019 ascent of Waukauyengtipu): https://www.darrellcarpenay.work
 Website of Mateusz Wrazidlo (co-organizer and member of the 2019 ascent of Waukauyengtipu): https://www.explority.online

Cuyuni-Mazaruni
Mountains of Guyana